Jeremy Thatcher, Dragon Hatcher is a novel by Bruce Coville and is part of the Magic Shop Books. It was published by in 1991 by the Harcourt Brace Jovanovich imprint Jane Yolen Books. It was issued in paperback by Aladdin Books and reissued by Harcourt in 2007.

Plot
Jeremy Thatcher knows a thing or two about raising animals—after all, his dad is a veterinarian. But after he leaves Mr. Elive's magic shop with a strange marbled egg, it soon becomes clear that this is one pet he wasn't prepared for. How is he supposed to keep a flame-breathing dragon with razor-sharp teeth and an out-of-control appetite in his bedroom? If the playful baby dragon is ever to grow up to become a magnificent beast of myth and legend, it needs Jeremy and though he doesn't know it yet, Jeremy needs a dragon with a strong connection.

Reviews & Interviews
Jeremy Thatcher, Dragon Hatcher has gained positive reviews. Many people find it fun and refreshing. Kids enjoy it. Yet, some say that there is a fine line between "fantasy" and "reality". Kirkus Reviews wrote that it was "A funny, enjoyable, imaginative story whose serious undercurrents lend it unexpected depth."
According to Christopher Paolini, it also served as inspiration for his book Eragon, as he had loved the story's dragon-hatching storyline.
"Q: As you know, there has been a lot of social controversy about exposing kids to reality vs. fantasy. What are your thoughts about the social implications of "magic" in the lives of our children? Is the use of "magic" in your books just fantasy, just fun?
A: Sometimes kids do a much better job at telling the difference between fantasy and reality than a group of adults. Jeremy Thatcher, Dragon Hatcher has been taken off the shelf in one school district for what they called "satanic content"—the presence of the dragon, the chicken livers, the silver gleam, and the use of black and red colors here and there in the book. It went back on the shelf after a protracted discussion and once I got involved in the issue. But I can't address magic across the spectrum because different people have different feelings about it. I can only say that, for me, fantasy is a way of telling an amusing and engaging story and fantasy fiction sometimes addresses important issues at a deeper level than realistic fiction does. C. S. Lewis said "Sometimes the best way to tell the truth is to tell a fairy tale."

Awards
The Utah's children book award in 1994. "Always grab the reader by the throat in the first line," says Bruce Coville, author of "Jeremy Thatcher: Dragon Hatcher," winner of the 1994 Utah Children's Book Award.
In 1992 Mythopoeic Award Nominated Coville's Jeremy Thatcher Dragon Hatcher for Best Children's Fantasy Literature.

Challenges
In Iowa, parents challenged Coville's novel because it "contained reference to witchcraft and devil worship." Eventually it was proven that there was no references to the devil or witchcraft but the parents thought the mention of silver, red, and black and the symbols of the moon and the stars were all connected to witchcraft and devil worship. The book remained on the shelves.

References

External links 

 
 https://web.archive.org/web/20140419022506/http://www.harcourtbooks.com/authorinterviews/bookinterview_Coville.asp
 https://books.google.com/books?id=3P5bAgAAQBAJ&pg=PT64
 http://www.deseretnews.com/article/349594/FIERY-DRAGON-HATCHER-WINS-UTAH-CHILDRENS-BOOK-AWARD.html?pg=all
 http://dreamingaboutotherworlds.blogspot.ca/1992/12/1992-mythopoeic-award-nominees.html

American children's novels
1991 American novels
Books about dragons
1991 children's books
Novels by Bruce Coville